Dermot Nally (born 5 October 1980 in Cork) is an Irish former cyclist.

Major results
2002
1st  U23 National Road Race Championships
1st Stage 2 Giro d'Abruzzo
2004
1st Stage 3 FBD Insurance Rás

References

1980 births
Living people
Irish male cyclists